Sir Joseph Bailey, 1st Baronet (21 January 1783 – 20 November 1858), was an English ironmaster and Conservative Party Member of Parliament (MP).

Bailey was born in 1783 in Great Wenham, Suffolk, the son of John Bailey, of Wakefield and his wife Susannah. His parents had moved from Normanton, near Wakefield, in around 1780 by which time they had already had at least three children (Ann, Elizabeth and William). Joseph was the second child of a further five children to be born in Great Wenham (the others being an older sister, Susan, and three younger siblings, John, Thomas and Crawshay).

He was involved in the iron industry in South Wales and served as High Sheriff of Monmouthshire for 1826. He also represented Worcester in the House of Commons from 1835 to 1847 and Breconshire from 1847 to 1858. In 1852 he was created a Baronet, of Glanusk Park estate in the County of Brecon.

Bailey married, firstly, Maria, daughter of Joseph Latham, in 1810. In about 1826 he bought Glanusk Park and had a mansion house built there. After his first wife's death in 1827 he married, secondly, Mary Anne, daughter of John Thomas Henry Hopper, in 1830. He died in November 1858, aged 75, and was succeeded in his title by his grandson Joseph Russell Bailey, who in 1899 was elevated to the peerage as Baron Glanusk. Lady Bailey died in 1874.

His daughter Jane Bailey married James Stuart Menteath, 2nd Baronet of Closeburn and Mansfield.

References

Kidd, Charles, Williamson, David (editors). Debrett's Peerage and Baronetage (1990 edition). New York: St Martin's Press, 1990.
Watkin William Price, M.A., (1873–1967), Aberdare, BAILEY , Sir JOSEPH ( 1783 - 1858 ), baronet, iron-master, landowner, and M.P. Dictionary of Welsh Biography, National Library of Wales, 2009 Honourable Society of Cymmrodorion, Welsh Biography Online

External links 
 

1783 births
1858 deaths
Baronets in the Baronetage of the United Kingdom
British ironmasters
19th-century English businesspeople
Members of the Cambrian Archaeological Association
People of the Industrial Revolution
Conservative Party (UK) MPs for English constituencies
Conservative Party (UK) MPs for Welsh constituencies
UK MPs 1835–1837
UK MPs 1837–1841
UK MPs 1841–1847
UK MPs 1847–1852
UK MPs 1852–1857
UK MPs 1857–1859
High Sheriffs of Monmouthshire
Welsh landowners